The following sites were added to the National Register of Historic Places as part of the Archeological Resources of Everglades National Park Multiple Property Submission (or MPS).

References

Everglades
Everglades
National Register of Historic Places Multiple Property Submissions in Florida
Everglades National Park